Edward Reilly (c. 1839 - March 29, 1872) was a journalist and politician in Prince Edward Island.

Reilly replaced Edward Whelan in the assembly after a by-election in 1867.

References 
 Biography at the Dictionary of Canadian Biography Online

Colony of Prince Edward Island people
Year of birth uncertain
1872 deaths